The 2021–22 season was the 103rd season in the existence of U.S. Salernitana 1919 and the club's first season back in the top flight of Italian football since 1999. In addition to the domestic league, Salernitana participated in this season's edition of the Coppa Italia.

Players

First-team squad

Out on loan

Transfers

Pre-season and friendlies

Competitions

Overall record

Serie A

League table

Results summary

Results by round

Matches
The league fixtures were announced on 14 July 2021.

Coppa Italia

References

U.S. Salernitana 1919 seasons
Salernitana